Alofi Bay is the northern of the two large bays which make up most of the west coast of the island of Niue, the other being Avatele Bay south of it. It stretches from Makapu Point in the island's northwest to Halagigie Point, the island's westernmost extremity.

The island's largest settlement, Alofi, is located close to the shore of the bay, as are the smaller settlements of Aliutu and Tufukia.

Landforms of Niue
Bays of the Pacific Ocean
Bays of Oceania